The Trillium Cup is an annual rivalry between the Columbus Crew and Toronto FC. The Trillium Cup is named after the trillium, which is both the official flower of the Canadian province of Ontario, and the official wildflower of the U.S. state of Ohio. The rivalries draw on the team's similarities: two teams are geographically near the Great Lakes that border the United States and Canada and both teams also play in a soccer-specific stadium. The cup is awarded to the team that wins the most points from the series at the season's end. In the event of a draw on points, the first tiebreak is determined by the away goals rule, then by the team with the largest overall goal differential at the conclusion of the match.

History
The Trillium Cup was instituted in 2008, the second season of Toronto FC's play in Major League Soccer (MLS). The inaugural game of the Trillium Cup was played on March 29, 2008 at Columbus Crew Stadium.

The initial rivalry between the Trillium teams was supported by the mayors of the respective cities. In 2008, Mayor Michael B. Coleman of Columbus and Mayor David Miller of Toronto started a small wager on their respective team for the first installment of the Trillium Cup – the mayor of the losing team was required to wear the winning team's jersey.

The rivalry became more intense when Toronto FC fans bought 2,500 tickets to the inaugural game at Columbus Crew Stadium, with buses organized for fans from Toronto heading to Columbus for the first game on March 29, 2008. The Crew won 2–0 over their new rival. The second and third meetings, at Toronto's BMO Field, were draws; 0–0 and 1–1, respectively. The Crew claimed the inaugural Trillium Cup with a 5–2 score on points earned.

In 2011, Toronto defeated Columbus 4–2, recording their first ever win against the Crew and securing their first Trillium Cup.

In 2017, Toronto and Columbus met for the first time in the MLS Cup Playoffs, in the Eastern Conference Finals, as Toronto advanced to the MLS Cup Final 1–0 on aggregate.

In 2020 and 2021, COVID-19 travel restrictions imposed by the Canadian Government forced Toronto to play rivalry matches in Pratt & Whitney Stadium in Connecticut in 2020 followed by Orlando SC's Exploria Stadium in Orlando, Florida in 2021 where Toronto played home matches in these stadiums as the home team. This marked the first time that the rivalry matches were played on neutral ground. In 2020, Toronto won their only meeting in 2020 with Columbus 3–1 in September 2020. The next year Toronto won the of first leg of the rivalry match in 2021 with a score of 2–0. Columbus Crew would later win the second leg of the rivalry in 2021 on the last rivalry match to be taken place at the Historic Crew Stadium before the Columbus Crew moves to Lower.com Field in July 2021. Columbus won the match 2–1.

Winners by year

Series results

+ Points based on wins (3), draws (1) and losses (0)
– Tiebreakers: 1) away goals for, 2) goal differential, 3) previous year winners

Statistics

See also 

 Lamar Hunt Pioneer Cup, a preseason match played between FC Dallas and Columbus Crew
 MLS rivalry cups

Notes

References 

Columbus Crew
Toronto FC
Major League Soccer rivalries
Soccer cup competitions in Canada
Soccer cup competitions in the United States
2008 establishments in Ontario
2008 establishments in Ohio
Recurring sporting events established in 2008